Thomas Henry Swain (29 October 1911 – 2 March 1979) was a British Labour politician who served as Member of Parliament for the constituency of North East Derbyshire from 1959 until he died in office 20 years later.

Born in Burton upon Trent, Swain was educated at the town's Broadway School. He was a miner for 34 years, from the age of 14 up to his election to Parliament, and held various offices in the National Union of Mineworkers including vice-president of the Derbyshire area. He was a councillor on Derbyshire County Council.

Swain was elected to Parliament in the 1959 general election. He died in a road accident in Chesterfield in March 1979 at the age of 67, and his seat was vacant when the general election was called for that May. Four weeks after his death, the Government lost a vital vote of confidence by a single vote, leading to the election which brought Margaret Thatcher to power. Had he not been killed, the vote of confidence would have ended in a tie and, by precedent, the Speaker's casting vote would have gone to the Government.

Personal life 
He had 10 children.

References

External links 
 

1911 births
1979 deaths
Labour Party (UK) MPs for English constituencies
Councillors in Derbyshire
National Union of Mineworkers-sponsored MPs
UK MPs 1959–1964
UK MPs 1964–1966
UK MPs 1966–1970
UK MPs 1970–1974
UK MPs 1974
UK MPs 1974–1979
People from Burton upon Trent
Road incident deaths in England
Members of the Parliament of the United Kingdom for constituencies in Derbyshire